"Old Church Basement" is a song performed by American contemporary worship bands Elevation Worship and Maverick City Music, which features vocals from Dante Bowe. The song was released as the opening track of the collaborative live album of the same name on April 30, 2021. The song was written by Brandon Lake, Chandler Moore, Dante Bowe, and Steven Furtick.

"Old Church Basement" debuted at No. 15 on the US Hot Christian Songs chart, and at No. 4 on the Hot Gospel Songs chart, despite not being released as an official single.

Composition

Commercial performance
Following the release of the album, "Old Church Basement" made its debut at No. 15 on the US Hot Christian Songs chart, and at No. 4 on the Hot Gospel Songs chart, both dated May 15, 2021.

Music videos
On April 30, 2021, Elevation Worship published the lyric video of the song on YouTube.

On May  3, 2021, Elevation Worship released the official music video of "Old Church Basement" on their YouTube channel. The video shows Dante Bowe leading the song.

Charts

Weekly charts

Year-end charts

References

External links
 

2021 songs
Elevation Worship songs
Maverick City Music songs
Dante Bowe songs
Songs written by Steven Furtick
Songs written by Dante Bowe
Songs written by Chandler Moore
Songs written by Brandon Lake